Ladislav Heythum (born 22 May 1950) is a Czech rower. He competed in the men's eight event at the 1972 Summer Olympics.

References

1950 births
Living people
Czech male rowers
Olympic rowers of Czechoslovakia
Rowers at the 1972 Summer Olympics
Rowers from Prague